Papyrus Oxyrhynchus 413 (P. Oxy. III 413 or P. Oxy. 413) is a manuscript of an adaptation of Euripides' Iphigeneia in Tauris (Iφιγένεια ἡ ἐν Ταύροις). The setting is shifted from Greece to India. The anonymous adaptation is known as the Charition mime after the main character. The verso of the papyrus features an unrelated mime involving a noblewoman plotting with her two slaves to poison an old man (possibly her husband).

The manuscript is held by the Bodleian Library as Ms. Gr. Class. b 4 (P). The manuscript is dated to the second century, possibly the Antonine period.

References

Further reading

 Edith Hall, Iphigenia in Oxyrhynchus and India: Greek Tragedy for Everyone

B. P. Grenfell & A. S. Hunt, Oxyrhynchus Papyri III, 401 (1903), pp.  41-57.

Ancient Greek plays
413
2nd-century manuscripts